Putong Temple is a Buddhist temple located on Mount Yangqi in Shangli County, Jiangxi, China. It is the cradle of the Yangqi sect of Linji school, one of five schools of Chan Buddhism.

History

Tang dynasty
The temple was built as "Guangli Chan Temple" by a renowned Chan master Chengguang in 753, during the reign of Emperor Xuanzong in the Tang dynasty (618–907). It was enlarged by Chan master Zhenshu in the Dali era between 766 and 779.

Song dynasty
During the ruling of Emperor Renzong (1023–1063) in the Song dynasty (960–1279), Yangqi Fanghui, the Eighth Patriarch of Linji school and the founder of Yangqi sect, was invited to be the new abbot. He renamed the temple "Putong Temple", which has been used to date.

Ming dynasty
In 1374, at the dawn of Ming dynasty (1368–1644), monk Siguan restored the temple.

Qing dynasty
In 1736, in the 1st year of Qianlong period in the Qing dynasty (1644–1911), monks of Putong Temple raised funds to renovated and refurbished the temple.

In 1826, five years after the coronation of Daoguang Emperor, heavy rainfall in the mountain caused a catastrophic flood, Putong Temple was struck by it. In 1844, the reconstruction project of the temple was launched. The reconstruction took 7 years, and lasted from 1844 to 1850.

People's Republic of China
On July 1, 1957, the Jiangxi Provincial Government inscribed the temple as a provincial level cultural heritage.

In 1966, Mao Zedong launched the ten-year Cultural Revolution, the Red Guards attacked the temple and the government forced monks to return to secular life.

After the 3rd Plenary Session of the 11th Central Committee of the Communist Party of China, according to the national policy of free religious belief, Putong Temple was reopened for worship on.

In February 2010, Huitong was proposed as the new abbot of Putong Temple. Two years later, Shi Yongxin, the abbot of Shaolin Monastery, was unanimously chosen as Huitong's successor.

In June 2013, the Stupa of Chengguang and the Stupa of Zhenshu were listed among the seventh group of "Major National Historical and Cultural Sites in Jiangxi" by the State Council of China.

Architecture
The existing main buildings of Putong Temple include the Shanmen, Four Heavenly Kings Hall, Mahavira Hall, Hall of Maitreya, Hall of Guanyin, Hall of Guru, Buddhist Texts Library, Stupa of Chengguang, and Stupa of Zhenshu.

Mahavira Hall
The Mahavira Hall has a single-eave gable and hip roof. The hall enshrining the Three Sages of the West, namely Guanyin, Amitabha and Mahasthamaprapta. The statues of Eighteen Arhats stand on both sides of the hall.

Stupa of Chengguang
The Stupa of Chengguang was built in the Tang dynasty after the Parinirvana of Chan master Chengguang. On the outside, it was carved with reliefs of various Buddhas, lotuses, Hercules, monsters, etc.

Stupa of Zhenshu
The Stupa of Zhenshu was also built in the Tang dynasty in memory of Chan master Zhenshu, who made a significant contribution to Putong Temple.

References

Bibliography

External links
 

Buddhist temples in Jiangxi
Buildings and structures in Pingxiang, Jiangxi
Tourist attractions in Pingxiang, Jiangxi
20th-century establishments in China
20th-century Buddhist temples
Religious buildings and structures completed in the 1980s